Tolon is the name of several rural localities in Russia.

Modern localities
Tolon, Bakhsytsky Rural Okrug, Churapchinsky District, Sakha Republic, a selo in Bakhsytsky Rural Okrug of Churapchinsky District in the Sakha Republic
Tolon, Chakyrsky Rural Okrug, Churapchinsky District, Sakha Republic, a selo in Chakyrsky Rural Okrug of Churapchinsky District in the Sakha Republic
Tolon, Lensky District, Sakha Republic, a selo in Tolonsky Rural Okrug of Lensky District in the Sakha Republic
Tolon, Khadansky Rural Okrug, Suntarsky District, Sakha Republic, a selo in Khadansky Rural Okrug of Suntarsky District in the Sakha Republic
Tolon, Tolonsky Rural Okrug, Suntarsky District, Sakha Republic, a selo in Tolonsky Rural Okrug of Suntarsky District in the Sakha Republic

Alternative names
Tolon, alternative name of Talon, a selo in Olsky District of Magadan Oblast;